Agnia Grigas (born November 21, 1979) is a Lithuanian-born American political scientist and author writing on security and energy issues of Russia, Europe, and the Post-Soviet states. Grigas is known as the author of The New Geopolitics of Natural Gas (Harvard University Press, 2017), Beyond Crimea: The New Russian Empire (Yale University Press, 2016) and The Politics of Energy and Memory Between the Baltic States and Russia (Ashgate, 2013). Grigas holds a Doctorate in International Relations from the University of Oxford. She is a nonresident Senior Fellow at the Atlantic Council in Washington, DC.

Education and early life

Agnia Grigas (née Baranauskaitė) was born in Kaunas, Lithuania while the country was still part of the Soviet Union. At the age of ten, she immigrated with her mother to the United States. In 2002 Grigas graduated cum laude with a Bachelor of Arts in Economics and Political Science from Columbia University. In 2006 she earned a Master’s (MPhil) in International Relations from St Antony's College, Oxford and subsequently in 2011 her Doctorate (DPhil) in International Relations from Brasenose College, Oxford.

Career

In 2002, Grigas started her career as a financial analyst at JPMorgan Chase in London, where she worked on Eurobond issuance for corporations and governments. In 2007, after completing her master’s studies, Grigas joined as an associate with global consultancy Eurasia Group, where she advised for its multinational clients on Central and Eastern Europe, post-Soviet States and launched the company’s coverage of the Baltic States.

In 2008-2009 Grigas served as an advisor on energy security and economy to the Lithuanian Ministry of Foreign Affairs, under Minister Vygaudas Ušackas. She worked on regional gas diversification solutions, including the early stages of the Klaipeda LNG FSRU and on concluding one of the nation’s largest foreign investment projects by Barclays. Subsequently, she went on to consult Barclays including leading to launch their global engineering center in Vilnius, Lithuania.

In 2014 Grigas became a nonresident Senior Fellow at the McKinnon Center for Global Affairs at Occidental College in Los Angeles. In 2015, she joined the Truman National Security Project as a Security Fellow. Since 2015 she is a nonresident Senior Fellow at the Dinu Patriciu Eurasia Center in Atlantic Council in Washington, DC.

Books

Grigas’s first book examines the foreign policies of the Baltic States towards Russia in respect of the politics of oil and gas, and the Soviet historical legacy. The second edition was released in 2016 by Routledge.

Grigas's second book illustrates how Moscow has consistently used its compatriots in bordering nations for its territorial ambitions and demonstrates how this policy has been implemented in Ukraine and Georgia and why countries like Moldova, Kazakhstan, the Baltic States, and others are also at risk.

Grigas's third book demonstrates how the boom in shale gas production in the United States, the growth of global LNG trade, and the buildup of gas transport infrastructure worldwide has had a transformative effect on the natural gas industry.

References

Living people
Soviet emigrants to the United States
American women political scientists
American political scientists
1979 births
JPMorgan Chase employees
Columbia College (New York) alumni
Alumni of St Antony's College, Oxford
Alumni of Brasenose College, Oxford
21st-century American women